Lampronia russatella is a moth of the family Prodoxidae. It is found in mesic forests in eastern North America.

The wingspan is about 12 mm. The forewings are dark fuscous with a purplish sheen. There is a yellowish white band near the base of the wing and two creamy spots on the termen. The hindwings are grey with reddish tinge. Adults are on wing from May to July.

References

Moths described in 1860
Prodoxidae
Moths of North America